Simone Vaturi (born 20 July 1988) is an Italian ice dancer. With former partner Lorenza Alessandrini, he is the 2010 and 2013 Cup of Nice silver medalist, 2011 and 2012 Ondrej Nepela Memorial silver medalist, and a two-time Italian national bronze medalist.

Personal life 
Simone Vaturi has an elder brother, Andrea Vaturi, who is a choreographer and former competitive ice dancer. As of December 2013, he is a student at the University of Milan.

Career 
Early in his career, Vaturi skated with Serena Tancredi.

In 2007, he teamed up with Lorenza Alessandrini. They placed fifth at the 2010 World Junior Championships. Later that year, Alessandrini broke a rib in training causing them to miss the 2010–11 Grand Prix season. They returned to competition to win the senior bronze medal at the Italian Championships and were assigned one of Italy's two ice dance berths to the 2011 European Championships. They finished 16th in their first appearance at the event.

In the 2011–2012 season, Alessandrini/Vaturi made their senior Grand Prix debut at 2011 NHK Trophy where they finished 5th. They again finished third at the Italian Championships. They were not named in the Italian team to the European Championships. Alessandrini/Vaturi were coached by Roberto Pelizzola and Nicoletta Lunghi in Italy until January 2012 when they moved to Detroit, Michigan to train under new coaches Pasquale Camerlengo, Massimo Scali, and Anjelika Krylova. They made their senior World debut at the 2012 World Championships in Nice, France.

In mid-December 2012, a fall while training a lift resulted in an injury to Vaturi and the team's withdrawal from the 2013 Italian Championships.

Vaturi ended their partnership in April 2014.

Programs 
(with Alessandrini)

Competitive highlights 

(With Riazanova)

(With Alessandrini)

References

External links 

 

Italian male ice dancers
1988 births
Living people
Figure skaters from Milan
Competitors at the 2013 Winter Universiade
Competitors at the 2011 Winter Universiade